Meine Pit (9 November 1931 – 1 February 2014) was a Dutch politician, he served at different times as a member of the Senate of the Netherlands, and States-Provincial of Gelderland between 1976 and 1999 for the Labour Party.

In the Senate Pit was party spokesperson for the topics of economic affairs and agriculture. He was the only party member to vote against the Betuweroute. In 1995 he was re-elected on the basis of preferential votes.

References

External links
  Parlement.com biography

1931 births
2014 deaths
People from Steenwijkerland
Labour Party (Netherlands) politicians
Members of the Senate (Netherlands)
Members of the Provincial Council of Gelderland